Susana Mendes (born 1987) is an Angolan journalist. At the age of 23, she was appointed editor of the Angolense, making her Angola's first female editor of a major weekly newspaper. In 2020 she joined Vida TV as editorial coordinator of their information department.

Rafael Marques has praised her contributions to Angolan journalism:

Life
Susana Mendes was born in Benguela in western Angola. She attended high school in Luanda, and while there started training at the state-owned Rádio Nacional Angola. At the age of 17, she began working as a reporter at the Luanda-based business newspaper Agora. The job enabled her to pay for her education at Universidade Independente de Angola. Mendes then worked at A Capital, a private anti-corruption weekly.

In 2005 Americo Gonçalves, founder of Angolense as well as A Capital, recruited her to be editor of Angolense. 

In 2008 Mendes joined other feminists to create the Forum of Women Journalists for Gender Equality (FMJIG). Members created a series of radio programs in 2009 to promote a draft bill crimininalizing domestic violence. The bill was introduced in 2010, though the legislation lacks penalties and the assembly has not acted on it.

In 2009-10 Mendes was vice president of the Johannesburg-based Africa Investigative Reporters Forum.

References

1987 births
Living people
African newspaper editors
Women newspaper editors
Angolan journalists
Angolan women's rights activists